Football Club Sant'Antonio Abate is an Italian association football club located in Sant'Antonio Abate, Campania. Currently it plays in Serie D.

History
The club was founded in 1971.

At the end of the 2010-11 Serie D season, the club was relegated to Eccellenza Campania after the play-off, but it was readmitted on 5 August 2011 to fill vacancies.

Serie D 2011–12

In the 2011–12 season the club gained access to the Serie D promotion play-off with direct admission to the semifinal as winner of Coppa Italia Serie D, where it was eliminated by Cosenza.

Colors and badge
Its colors are yellow and red

Honours
 Coppa Italia Serie D:
Champion (1): 2011–12

References

External links
 Official homepage

Association football clubs established in 1971
Football clubs in Campania
1971 establishments in Italy